Trolls is a Troll doll-themed platform game developed and published by Flair Software for the Amiga, MS-DOS and Commodore 64 in 1992. In 1994 it was ported to the CD32.

In 2009 it was released for Nintendo's DSiWare platform as Oscar in Toyland; since the Trolls license had lapsed, all Troll imagery was removed from the game and replaced with Flair's original creation Oscar.

Release
Trolls was originally released in 1992 for Amiga, MS-DOS and Commodore 64. The CD32 port came in 1994. It was also released with An American Tail: The Computer Adventures of Fievel and His Friends and Rock-A-Doodle Computerized Coloring Book on the Capstone CD Game Kids Collection.

Reception

Amiga Format gave the game an 82% rating.

Oscar in Toyland received lukewarm reviews.

Legacy
Oscar in Toyland was released in 2009.

Two sequels would be made: Oscar in Movieland is a port of the original Oscar while Oscar in Toyland 2 is a new game.

References

External links

1992 video games
Amiga games
Amiga CD32 games
Commodore 64 games
DOS games
DSiWare games
Nintendo DS games
Trolls (franchise)
Christmas video games
Video games about toys
Video games based on toys
Video games developed in the United Kingdom
Video games scored by Phillip Nixon
Flair Software games